Julius Ralph Davidson or JR Davidson (1889-1977) was a Mid-century modern American architect known for advancing modern architecture in Los Angeles and participating in Arts & Architecture magazine's Case Study House Program.

Davidson was part of a group of Jewish architects who sought refuge in Los Angeles after having to flee Europe due to persecution inflicted by the Nazis including the Holocaust. This group included Richard Neutra, Rudolph Schindler, Kem Weber, and Paul László who furthered modern architecture in Los Angeles in the 1930s and 40s. Architectural historians and critics have described Davidson as being conversant in and talented at bridging both Art Deco, International, and Modernist styles. His modern interiors have been noted for their warmth, fluidity, and well-planned storage space. Writer Thomas Mann, who had an aversion to glass-box styles, selected Davidson as the architect of his Pacific Palisades home for his moderate modernism.

Life and work
Julius Ralph Davidson was born to a Jewish family in Berlin, Germany in 1889. After spending several years in London working for the office of Frank Stewart Murray and in Paris, JR Davidson married Greta Wollstein in 1914. He served in World War I for two-and-a-half years beginning in 1915. After the war, he returned to Berlin and later moved to Los Angeles in 1923, where he worked for architect Robert D. Faquhar, Cecil B. DeMille, and developers Hite-Bilike before moving to Chicago in 1933, where he remodeled hotel interiors. He returned to Los Angeles in 1936 and would remain in Southern California for the rest of his life. Most of his commissions after 1936 were residential. In 1938, he began teaching at Art Center College of Design. He retired in 1972 and died in Ojai, California in 1977. JR Davidson donated his papers to the Architecture and Design Collection at the University of California, Santa Barbara in 1972 and 1975. His realized work was extensively photographed by Julius Shulman.

Case Study House Program

In the announcement for the Case Study House Program, Arts & Architecture magazine recognized Davidson's work as the first modern designs for stores, restaurants, offices, and single and multiple residential units in Los Angeles and Chicago. Davidson designed Case Study Houses #1, #2, #11, and #15. House #11 in West Los Angeles was the first to be built and the first to be demolished. House #1 is located at 10152 Toluca Lake Avenue in the Los Angeles neighborhood of Toluca Lake. The only other house besides the Toluca Lake house that is still extant is Case Study House #15 located in La Canada Flintridge, California.

List of Selected Projects

References

Further reading
McCoy, Esther. The Second Generation. Salt Lake City: Gibbs Smith, 1984.

Pfaff, Lillian.  “J.R. Davidson:  A European Contribution to California Modernism”.  
Basel: Birkhauser Verlag, 2019.

External links
 University of California, Santa Barbara: Finding Aid for the Julius Ralph Davidson papers, 1904-1977 — UCSB Art, Design & Architecture Museum, Architecture and Design Collection.

1889 births
1973 deaths
Modernist architects from the United States
Architects from Los Angeles
American people of German-Jewish descent
Jewish architects
 
Set designers
Art Center College of Design faculty
German emigrants to the United States
German expatriates in France
German expatriates in the United Kingdom
German military personnel of World War I
20th-century American architects